

List of representatives
Yūji Tsushima, Liberal Democratic Party、1976・1979・1980・1983・1986・1990・1993

Election results
1993 Japanese general election
Yūji Tsushima, Liberal Democratic Party
1990 Japanese general election
Yūji Tsushima, Liberal Democratic Party
1986 Japanese general election
Yūji Tsushima, Liberal Democratic Party
1983 Japanese general election
Yūji Tsushima, Liberal Democratic Party
1980 Japanese general election
Yūji Tsushima, Liberal Democratic Party
1979 Japanese general election
Yūji Tsushima, Liberal Democratic Party
1976 Japanese general election
Yūji Tsushima, Liberal Democratic Party
1947 Japanese general election

Aomori Prefecture
History of Aomori Prefecture
Politics of Aomori Prefecture
Constituencies established in 1947